Cryptography Research, Inc. is a San Francisco based cryptography company specializing in applied cryptographic engineering, including technologies for building tamper-resistant semiconductors.  It was purchased on June 6, 2011 by Rambus for $342.5M.  The company licenses patents for protecting cryptographic devices against power analysis attacks. The company's CryptoFirewall-brand ASIC cores are used in pay TV conditional access systems and anti-counterfeiting applications. CRI also developed BD+, a security component in the Blu-ray disc format, and played a role in the format war between HD DVD and Blu-ray.  The company's services group assists with security testing, disaster recovery, and training.

Cryptography Research protects its core operations from outside attack by maintaining a secured local network that is not connected to the Internet at all.  Employees who need to work with sensitive data have two computers on their desks — one to access the secure network, and a separate computer to access the Internet.

References

External links
 

Cryptography companies